was a Japanese doctor, medical scientist, educator and president of Tokyo Medical and Dental University (TMDU). He was best known as an expert on heart surgery.

Early life 
Suzuki earned his medical degree from TMDU in 1956. His training continued as a surgical intern in Tokyo at the U.S. Army Hospital. He was a surgical resident at Albany Medical School in New York.

Career 
In 1950, his medical career began as a staff surgeon at St Vincent's Hospital in Cleveland, Ohio. His academic career began in 1971 as an associate professor at the medical school of the University of Mississippi. When he returned to Japan in 1974, he was a professor of chest surgery at Juntendo University.

In 1983, he joined the faculty of TMDU. He was named president of TMDU in 1995.

Legacy 
Akio Suzuki Memorial Hall at TMDU is named after the doctor's honor.

References 

1929 births
2010 deaths
Japanese scientists